The Poles come from different West Slavic tribes living on territories belonging later to Poland in the early Middle Ages.

Kingdom of Poland (966–1569) 
Around the year 1000, the population of the Duchy of Poland is estimated at 1,000,000 to 1,250,000. Around 1370 Poland had 2 million inhabitants with a population density of 8.6 per square kilometer. Poland was less affected by the Black Death than Western Europe.

Although the population of the Kingdom of Poland in late Middle Ages consisted mostly of Poles, the influx of other cultures was significant: particularly notable were Jewish and German settlers, who often formed significant minorities or even majorities in urban centers. Sporadically migrants from other places like Scotland, and Netherlands settled in Poland as well. At that time other notable minorities included various incompletely assimilated people from other Slavic tribes (some of whom would eventually merge totally into the Polish people, while others merged into neighboring nations).

Around 1490, the combined population of Poland and Lithuania, in a personal union (the Polish–Lithuanian union) since the Union of Krewo a century before, is estimated at 8 million. An estimate for 1493 gives the combined population of Poland and Lithuania at 7.5 million (including 3.9 million in the Kingdom of Poland), breaking them down by ethnicity at 3.25 million Poles, 3.75 million Ruthenians and 0.5 million Lithuanians. The Ruthenians composed most of the population of the Grand Duchy of Lithuania: this is the reason that the late GDL is often called a Slavic country, alongside Poland, Russia, etc. In time, the adjective "Lithuanian" came to denote a Slav of the Grand Duchy.

Eventually, the Lithuanian speakers came to be known as Samogitians (see also Samogitian nobility), after the province in which they were the dominant majority. Another estimate for the combined population at the beginning of the 16th century gives 7.5 million, roughly split evenly, due to the much larger territory of the Grand Duchy (with about 10-15 people per square km in Poland and 3-5 people per square km in the Grand Duchy, and even less in the south-east Cossack borderlands). By 1500, about 15% of Poland's population lived in urban centers (settlements with over 500 people).

Polish–Lithuanian Commonwealth (1569–1795) 
By 1600, about 25% of Poland's population lived in urban centers (settlements with over 500 people). Major towns in Poland included: Gdańsk (Danzig) (70,000), Kraków (28,000), Warsaw (20,000-30,000), Poznań (20,000), Lwów (Lviv) (20,000), Elbląg (Elbing) (15,000), Toruń (Thorn) (12,000), Sandomierz (4,000-5,000), Kazimierz Dolny (4,000-5,000) and Gniezno (4,000-5,000).

The population of the Commonwealth of both nations was never overwhelmingly either Roman Catholic or Polish. This resulted from Poland's possession of Ukraine and federation with Lithuania; in both these countries ethnic Poles were a distinct minority. The Commonwealth comprised primarily four nations: Poles, Lithuanians, and Ukrainians and Belarusians (the latter two usually referred to together as Ruthenians). Shortly after the Union of Lublin (1569), at the turn of the 16th to 17th century, the Commonwealth population was around 7 million, with a rough breakdown of 4.5m Poles, 0.75m Lithuanians, 0.7m Jews and 2m Ruthenians. In 1618, after the Truce of Deulino the Commonwealth population increased together with its territory, reaching 12 million that could be roughly divided into: Poles – 4.5m, Ukrainians – 3.5m, Belarusians – 1.5m, Lithuanians – 0.75m, Prussians – 0.75m, Jews – 0.5m, Livonians – 0.5m; at that time nobility formed 10% and burghers, 15%. Population losses of 1648–1667 are estimated at 4m. Coupled with further population and territorial losses, by 1717 the Commonwealth population had fallen to 9m: roughly 4.5m Poles, 1.5m Ukrainians, 1.2m Belarusians, 0.8m Lithuanians, 0.5m Jews, 0.5m others The urban population was hit hard, falling to below 10%.

From 1648 to 1660, the Commonwealth lost between 30% and 50% of its population. During the Great Northern War, Poland's population contracted by 25% in 1709–1711.

To be Polish, in the non-Polish lands of the Commonwealth, was then much less an index of ethnicity than of religion and rank; it was a designation largely reserved for the landed noble class (szlachta), which included Poles but also many members of non-Polish origin who converted to Catholicism in increasing numbers with each following generation. For the non-Polish noble such conversion meant a final step of Polonization that followed the adoption of the Polish language and culture. Poland, as the culturally most advanced part of the Commonwealth, with the royal court, the capital, the largest cities, the second-oldest university in Central Europe (after Prague), and the more liberal and democratic social institutions has proven an irresistible magnet for the non-Polish nobility in the Commonwealth.

As a result, in the eastern territories a Polish (or Polonized) aristocracy dominated a peasantry whose great majority was neither Polish nor Roman Catholic. Moreover, the decades of peace brought huge colonization efforts to Ukraine, heightening the tensions among nobles, Jews, Cossacks (traditionally Orthodox), Polish and Ruthenian peasants. The latter, deprived of their native protectors among the Ruthenian nobility, turned for protection to cossacks that facilitated violence that in the end broke the Commonwealth. The tensions were aggravated by conflicts between Eastern Orthodoxy and the Ukrainian Greek Catholic Church following the Union of Brest, overall discrimination of Orthodox religions by dominant Catholicism, and several Cossack uprisings. In the west and north, many cities had sizable German minorities, often belonging to Reformed churches. The Commonwealth had also one of the largest Jewish diasporas in the world.

Until the Reformation, the szlachta were mostly Catholic or Eastern Orthodox. However, many families quickly adopted the Reformed religion. After the Counter-Reformation, when the Roman Catholic Church regained power in Poland, the szlachta became almost exclusively Roman Catholic, despite the fact that Roman Catholicism was not a majority religion (the Roman Catholic and Orthodox churches counted approximately 40% of the population each, while the remaining 20% were Jews and members of various Protestant churches). The Counter-Reformation in Poland, influenced by the Commonwealth tradition of religious tolerance, was based mostly on Jesuit propaganda, and was very peaceful when compared to excesses such as the Thirty Years' War elsewhere in Europe.

In the late 18th century, the first statistical estimates of Commonwealth population appeared. Aleksander Busching estimated the number of Commonwealth population for 8.5 million; Józef Wybicki in 1777 for 5,391,364; Stanisław Staszic in 1785 for 6 million; and Fryderyk Moszyński in 1789 for 7,354,620. Modern estimates tend to be higher; by 1770, on the eve of the partitions, Commonwealth had a population of about 11m-14m, about 10% of that - Jewish. The nobility constituted about 10%, the burghers, about 7-8%.

Partitions (1795–1918) 
By the First Partition in 1772, the Polish–Lithuanian Commonwealth lost about 211 000 km2 (30% of its territory, amounting at that time to about 733 000 km2), with a population of over four to five million people (about a third of its population of 14 million before the partitions).

After the Second Partition, Commonwealth lost about 307 000 km2, being reduced to 223 000 km2. Only about 4 million people remained in Poland at that time, which makes for a loss of another third of its original population, about a half of the remaining.

After the Third Partition, overall, Austria had gained about 18 percent of the former Commonwealth territory (130,000 km2) and about 32 percent of the population (3.85 million people). Prussia had gained about 20 percent of the former Commonwealth territory 149,000 km2) and about 23 percent of the population (2.6 million people). Russia had gained about 62 percent of the former Commonwealth territory (462,000 km2) and about 45 percent of the population (3.5 million people).

An estimate for 1815 gives 11.5 million Poles, out of which 5m were under Russian control (4 million in Congress Poland and 1 million in the territories incorporated into the Russian Empire), 3.5m in the Prussian partition territories and 3m in the Austrian partition territories.

Congress Poland had a population of about 4.25 million around 1830. In the Russian partition, the Pale of Settlement resulted in resettlement of many Russian Jews to the western fringes of Russian Empire, which now included part of Poland. This further increased the sizable community of Polish Jews. By 1914, about 31 million people inhabited the territories that would become the Second Polish Republic, the First World War saw the population of those territories drop to 26 million.

Second Polish Republic and World War II (1918–1945) 
Before World War II, the Polish lands were noted for the variety of their ethnic communities. Following the Polish-Soviet War, a large part of its population belonged to national minorities. The census of that year allocates 30.8% of the population in the minority. In 1931, the population of Poland was 31,916,000, including 15,428,000 males and 16,488,000 females. By January 1939, the population of Poland increased to 35,100,000. This total included 240,000 in Zaolzie which was under Polish control from October 1938 until August 1939. The population density was 90 persons per square km. In 1921, 24% of the population lived in towns and cities, by 1931 the ratio grew to 27%. Altogether, in 1921, there were 611 towns and cities in the country, by 1931 there were 636 municipalities. The six biggest cities of Poland (as of 1 January 1939) were Warsaw, Łódź, Lwów, Poznań, Kraków and Vilnius (Wilno). In 1931, Poland had the second largest Jewish population in the world, and one-fifth of all Jews resided within Poland's borders (approx. 3,136,000, roughly 10% of the entire Polish population).

According to historian Norman Davies the Polish census of 1931  listed the nationalities by language as Polish, 69% of the population, Ukrainian, 15%, Jews 8.5%, Belarusian, 4.70%, German, 2.2%, Russian 0.25%, Lithuanian, 0.25%, Czech 0.09%, Norman Davies included the Ruthenians with the Ukrainians however the Polish census figures list them as separate group with 3.82% of the population. The classification of the ethnic groups in Poland during the Second Polish Republic is a disputed topic, Tadeusz Piotrowski maintains that the 1931 Polish census "involved questionable methodology, especially the use of mother tongue as an indicator of nationality", noting that it had underestimated the number of non-Poles. The official figures for nationality from the 1931 Polish census based on the mother tongue put the percentage of ethnic Poles at 68.9%, Jews 8.6% and other minority groups 22.5%., Piotrowski cited a study by the Polish historian Jerzy Tomaszewski that puts that the adjusted census figures (taking religious affiliation into account) of ethnic Poles at 64.7%, Jews 9.8% and other minority groups 25.5% of Poland's population. Polish demographer Piotr Eberhardt maintains that it is commonly agreed that the criterion of declared language to classify ethnic groups led to an overestimation of the number of Poles in pre-war Poland. He notes that in general, the numbers declaring a particular language do not mesh with the numbers declaring the corresponding nationality. Members of ethnic minority groups believe that the language criterion led to an overestimation of Poles.

The detailed figures for the census published by the Polish government provided a breakdown by religion for the various language groups, the details of the Polish census of 1931 published by the Central Statistical Office the Polish Republic according to language and religion are as follows.:

Breakdown of Total 1931 Polish Population by Language and Religion

Figures may not add due to omitted answers and those not practicing or declaring a religion. Source: Polish Main Statistical Office (1931)

Breakdown of Total 1931 Polish Population by Language and Religion
Figures as % of Total Population

Figures may not add due to omitted answers and those not practicing or declaring a religion. Source: Polish Main Statistical Office (1931)

In the southeast, Ukrainian settlements were present in the regions east of Chełm and in the Carpathians east of Nowy Sącz. The three main native highlander populations were Łemkowie, Bojkowie and Huculi. In all the towns and cities there were large concentrations of Yiddish-speaking Jews. The Polish ethnographic area stretched eastward: in eastern Lithuania, Belarus, and western Ukraine, all of which had a mixed population, Poles predominated not only in the cities but also in numerous rural districts. There were significant Polish minorities in Daugavpils (in Latvia), Minsk (in Belarus), Bucovina (in Romania), and Kyiv (in Ukraine) (see Polish minority in the Soviet Union, Polish Autonomous District).

Second World War (1939–1945) 
See supplements: Occupation of Poland, World War II crimes in Poland, Holocaust in Poland

In the beginning of the war (September 1939) the territory of Poland was divided between the Nazi Germany and the USSR. By late-1941 following Operation Barbarossa Nazi Germany controlled the entire territory of the former Second Polish Republic, but in 1944-1945 the Red Army's offensive claimed the region for the USSR.

After both occupiers divided the territory of Poland between themselves, they conducted a series of actions aimed at suppression of Polish culture and repression of much of the Polish people. In August 2009 the Polish Institute of National Remembrance (IPN) researchers estimated Poland's dead (including Polish Jews) at between 5.47 and 5.67 million (due to German actions) and 150,000 (due to Soviet), or around 5.62 and 5.82 million total. About 90% of Polish Jews were killed during the Holocaust; many others emigrated in the succeeding years.

1. Population 1939 -Polish sources allocate the population by the primary language spoken, not by religion. Most Jews spoke Yiddish, however included with the Poles are about 200,000 Polish speaking Jews who are classified with the Polish group. Included with the Poles are 1,300,000 Eastern Orthodox & Greek Catholic adherents who are sometimes classified with the Ukrainian and Belarusian groups.

2. Natural Increase October 1939-December 1945 -After the war Polish demographers calculated the estimated natural population growth that occurred during the war.

3. Transfer of German Population Most of the ethnic German population fled during the war. Many of them were sent to forced labour.. In 1950 only about 40,000 of the pre-war ethnic German group remained in Poland in 1950, most of whom emigrated later in the 1950s. Others were also expelled .

4. War Dead In August 2009 the Polish Institute of National Remembrance (IPN) put the figure of Poland's dead at between 5,620,000 and 5,820,000. The IPN's figures include 3 million Polish Jews who were murdered in the Holocaust (200,000 included with Polish speakers); as well as Poles killed in 1943-44 during the massacres of Poles in Volhynia. The figures also include 150,000 victims of Soviet repression.

Deaths Due to German Occupation
Poles-The Institute of National Remembrance (IPN) figure for deaths of Poles due to the German occupation is 2,770,000. This figure includes "Direct War Losses" -543,000; "Murdered in Camps and in Pacification" -506,000; "Deaths in prisons and Camps" 1,146,000; "Deaths outside of prisons and Camps" 473,000; "Murdered in Eastern Regions" 100,000; "Deaths in other countries" 2,000. These figures include about 200,000 Polish speaking Jews who are considered Poles in Polish sources.

Jews-Polish researchers have determined that the Nazis murdered 1,860,000 Polish Jews in the extermination camps in Poland, plus another 1.0 million Polish Jewish deaths in prisons and ghettos. In addition 970,000 Jews from other nations were murdered in the Nazi extermination camps in Poland.

In the Polish figures of war dead are included 2.0 million Polish citizens of the Polish areas annexed by the Soviet Union, that were occupied by German Nazy forces after 22 June 1941. Contemporary Russian sources include these losses with Soviet war deaths.

Deaths Due to Soviet Occupation

The Polish Institute of National Remembrance (IPN) researchers estimated that 150,000 Polish citizens were executed due to Soviet repressions or died during deportations. Since the collapse of the USSR, Polish scholars have been able to do research in the Soviet archives on Polish losses during the Soviet occupation. Andrzej Paczkowski puts the number of Polish deaths at 90–100,000 of the 1.0 million persons deported and 30,000 executed by the Soviets.

5. Population Remaining in the USSR The number of Poles and Jews who remained in the USSR after the war was estimated at 1.4 million by Polish scholar and historian Krystyna Kersten. Included with the Poles remaining in the USSR are about 700,000 Eastern Orthodox & Greek Catholic adherents who are sometimes classified with the Ukrainian and Belarusian groups.

6. Emigration to the West Poles and Jews who remained in non communist countries after the war.

7. Population gain Recovered Territories Germans remaining in Poland after the war in the Recovered Territories.  This group included 1,130,000 bi-lingual Polish-German persons who declared their allegiance to Poland. Also remaining in 1950 were 94,000 German nationals, 36,000 Germans from pre-war Danzig and 1,500 ethnic Germans of other nations. Most of this group emigrated to Germany after 1956.  The ethnic German population remaining in the 1990s was about 300,000.

8. Reimmigration 1946-50 Poles resident in western Europe before the war, primarily in Germany and France, who returned to Poland after the war.

9. Natural Increase 1946-1950 This is the official Polish government data for births and natural deaths from January 1946 until the census of December 1950.

10. Population December 1950 Per Census The total population per the December 1950 census was 25 million. A breakdown by ethnic group was not given. However, we can estimate the Jewish population based on the postwar census taken by the Jewish community. Data for the Germans and others who remained in Poland after the war can be estimated using the 1946 Polish census

Post-Second World War (1945–present)

Early post-war period
Before World War II, a third of Poland's population was composed of ethnic minorities. After the war, however, Poland's minorities were mostly gone, due to the 1945 revision of borders, and the Holocaust. Under the National Repatriation Office (Państwowy Urząd Repatriacyjny), millions of Poles were forced to leave their homes in the eastern Kresy region and settle in the western former German territories. At the same time approximately 5 million remaining Germans (about 8 million had already fled or had been expelled and about 1 million had been killed in 1944–46) were similarly expelled from those territories into the Allied occupation zones. Ukrainian and Belarusian minorities found themselves now mostly within the borders of the Soviet Union; those who opposed this new policy (like the Ukrainian Insurgent Army in the Bieszczady Mountains region) were suppressed by the end of 1947 in the Operation Vistula.

The population of Jews in Poland, which formed the largest Jewish community in pre-war Europe at about 3.3 million people, was all but destroyed by 1945. Approximately 3 million Jews died of starvation in ghettos and labor camps, were slaughtered at the German Nazi extermination camps or by the Einsatzgruppen death squads. Between 40,000 and 100,000 Polish Jews survived the Holocaust in Poland, and another 50,000 to 170,000 were repatriated from the Soviet Union, and 20,000 to 40,000 from Germany and other countries. At its postwar peak, there were 180,000 to 240,000 Jews in Poland, settled mostly in Warsaw, Łódź, Kraków and Wrocław.

Poland's population diminished from 35 million in 1939 to just under 24 million in 1946. According to the national census, which took place on 14 February 1946, the number of inhabitants was 23,930,000, out of which 32% lived in cities and towns, and 68% lived in the countryside. The 1950 census (3 December 1950) showed the population rise to 25,008,000, and the 1960 census (6 December 1960) placed the population of Poland at 29,776,000. In 1950, Warsaw was the biggest city of the country, with population of 804,000. Second was Lodz (pop. 620,000), third Kraków (pop. 344,000), fourth Poznan (pop. 321,000), and fifth Wroclaw (pop. 309,000).

Females were in the majority in the country. In 1931, there were 105.6 women for 100 men. In 1946, the difference grew to 118.5/100, but in subsequent years, number of males grew, and in 1960, the ratio was 106.7/100.

Current situation

Most Germans were expelled from Poland and the annexed east German territories at the end of the war, while many Ukrainians, Rusyns and Belarusians lived in territories incorporated into the USSR. Small Ukrainian, Belarusian, Slovak, and Lithuanian minorities reside along the borders, and a German minority is concentrated near the southwestern city of Opole and in Masuria. Groups of Ukrainians and Polish Ruthenians also live in western Poland, where they were forcefully resettled by communists.

As a result of the migrations and the Soviet Unions radically altered borders under the rule of Joseph Stalin, the population of Poland became one of the most ethnically homogeneous in the world. Virtually all people in Poland claim Polish nationality, with Polish as their native tongue. Ukrainians resp. Rusyns, the largest minority group, are scattered in various northern districts. Lesser numbers of Belarusians and Lithuanians live in areas adjoining Belarus and Lithuania. The Jewish community, almost entirely Polonized, has been greatly reduced. In Silesia a significant segment of the population, of mixed Polish and German ancestry, tends to declare itself as Polish or German according to political circumstances. Minorities of Germans remain in Pomerania, Silesia, East Prussia, and Lubus.

Small populations of Polish Tatars still exist. Some Polish towns, mainly in northeastern Poland have mosques. Tatars arrived as mercenary soldiers beginning in the late 14th century. The Tatar population reached approximately 100,000 in 1630 but is less than 500 in 2000. See also Islam in Poland.

A recent large migration of Poles took place following Poland's accession to the European Union and opening of the EU's labor market; with an approximate number of 2 million primarily young Poles taking up jobs abroad.

General statistics
Demographics estimates for period before statistics and reliable data collection from censuses should be seen as giving only a rough order of magnitude, not any precise number.

Changes of Poland's population through centuries

Sources: GUS, The World Factbook

Urban demographics statistics 
Changes in the population of major Polish cities.

Note that this table contains information on some cities that are not within the borders of modern Poland, and others that have not been within those borders for many centuries. See Territorial changes of Poland for more details on that issue.

See also
 Demographics of Poland
 Polish diaspora
 Prehistory and protohistory of Poland

References

External links 
 Commonwealth of Diverse Cultures: Poland's Heritage
historical demographical data for Poland - 19th and 20th centuries 

 
Poland